BloodRayne 2: Deliverance (also known as BloodRayne 2 or BloodRayne: Deliverance) is a 2007 direct-to-DVD Western horror film, set in 1880s America, and directed by Uwe Boll. The film is a sequel to the 2005 film BloodRayne, which was also directed by Uwe Boll, and stars Kristanna Loken. In Deliverance, Natassia Malthe replaces Loken in the lead role.

Plot  
Newton Piles (Chris Coppola), a reporter on assignment for the Chicago Chronicle, has come to the town of Deliverance, Montana, to record tales of the Wild West. The peaceful and quiet town is expecting the arrival of the first Transcontinental Railroad in one week. Along with the railroad, however, arrives an unwelcome and deadly guest, a vampiric Billy the Kid. Using the railway, the 357-year-old Transylvanian vampire is building an army of cowboy vampires to take over the country and create a vampire kingdom in the New World. Billy and his horde go on a rampage, slaughtering townspeople and rounding up children. Billy spares Newton's life and promises Newton the greatest story ever told.

Billy's plans hit a snag when Rayne arrives in the town. Rayne is a Dhampir, the product of an unnatural union between a vampire and a human: she wields all the powers of a vampire, yet none of the weaknesses. Born over a century earlier in Romania, Rayne has hunted vampires for a long time and now she sets her sights on Billy.

Cast 
 Natassia Malthe as Rayne
 Zack Ward as Billy "The Kid"
 Michael Paré as Pat Garrett
 Chris Coppola as Newton Pyles
 Chris Spencer as Bob, The Bartender
 Brendan Fletcher as Muller
 Sarah-Jane Redmond as Martha
 Michael Teigen as "Slime Bag" Franson
 Michael Eklund as The Preacher
 John Novak as Sheriff Cobden
 Tyron Leitso as Fleetwood
 Jodelle Ferland as Sally
 Mike Dopud as Flintlock Hogan
 Cole Heppell as William

Critical reception 
BloodRayne 2: Deliverance, received generally negative reviews. It holds  rating on Rotten Tomatoes based on  reviews with critics panning it as: "Slow-paced, dry and anything but sexy."

Sequel 
 
A sequel titled BloodRayne: The Third Reich featuring Natassia Malthe was released in 2011.

See also
Vampire film

References

External links 
 
 
 

2007 films
2007 horror films
2000s Western (genre) horror films
2000s action horror films
BloodRayne films
Brightlight Pictures films
Canadian Western (genre) horror films
Canadian action horror films
Cultural depictions of Pat Garrett
Direct-to-video horror films
Direct-to-video sequel films
Films about Billy the Kid
Films directed by Uwe Boll
Films shot in Vancouver
German action horror films
Live-action films based on video games
Canadian vampire films
2000s English-language films
English-language Canadian films
English-language German films
German vampire films
2000s American films
2000s Canadian films
2000s German films